Kibe may refer to:

 Kibbeh, a family of dishes based on spiced ground meat and grain
 Kibe, a surname
 A kibe, or ulcerated chilblain
 Kibe, a lineage of the Jōdo Shinshū school of Buddhism
 KIBE FM, a radio station licensed to Broken Bow, Oklahoma, United States
 Kibe (footballer) (born 2000), Brazilian footballer